Harbour Plaza Residences is a mixed-use development  in the South Core district of Toronto, Ontario. It consists of 63- and 67-storey condominium towers and 200,000 square feet of retail space. Harbour Plaza's soaring towers are anchored by a retail podium, in addition to the One York Street commercial office tower also known as the Sun Life Financial Tower. The two residential towers, rising to 237 m (778 ft) and 228 m (748 ft), are the tallest twin buildings in Canada. The complex was developed by Menkes Developments.

Among the tenants of the four-storey retail podium are Coppa's Fresh Market, Mercatino, Pure Fitness, and Winners.

The buildings were completed in 2016.

PATH
There will be an addition to the PATH network that will connect Queens Quay to Union Station.

References

External links

Skyscrapers in Toronto
Residential condominiums in Canada